Antonio Wagner de Moraes (born June 2, 1966) is a former Brazilian football player.

Club statistics

References

External links

1966 births
Living people
Brazilian footballers
Brazilian expatriate footballers
J1 League players
Japan Football League (1992–1998) players
Expatriate footballers in Japan
Shonan Bellmare players
Tokushima Vortis players
Kashiwa Reysol players
Association football forwards